The Bréguet 521 Bizerte was a long-range military reconnaissance flying boat built by the French aviation company Breguet.

Development

A biplane of all-metal construction, with three engines mounted in nacelles between the upper and lower wings, the aircraft was a development of the Breguet S.8/2 Calcutta, which itself was a militarised licensed version of the British Short S.8 Calcutta. It was built to meet a French Navy specification for a long-range flying boat issued in 1932, competing against proposals from Latécoère (the 582), Lioré et Olivier (the unbuilt LeO H42) and Loire Aviation (the Loire 70). The first prototype made its maiden flight on 11 September 1933, with it being purchased, and an order placed for two more on 4 January 1934.

A series of small orders for production Bizertes was placed, starting with an order for three in 1934, with the last order, for 12 (nine of which were later cancelled) being placed in September 1939. In total, 37 Bizertes were built, with the last three not being completed until after the French surrender in June 1940.

In 1935 a civilian version – the Breguet Br.530 Saigon – was produced.

Operational history
After the first flight in September 1933, 37 aircraft were produced, which served with five squadrons of the French Navy from 1935 until 1940. Two squadrons remained in service with the Vichy Navy after the armistice, at Berre in Southern France and Karouba in Tunisia, with six aircraft each. The German Luftwaffe purchased a number of Bizertes for its Seenotdienst (Air-Sea Rescue) service in 1940, which (in addition to the three undelivered Bizertes) it  used to equip a squadron based at Brest on the French Atlantic coast. When Vichy France was occupied by the Germans following the Allied invasion of North Africa in November 1942, the remaining Vichy Bizertes were taken over by the Luftwaffe, allowing further Seenotdienst units to be established at Biscarrosse and Berre. Following the Allied Invasion of Southern France in August 1944, one of the Luftwaffe Bizertes was discovered by French forces and used for communications duties until spares ran out.

Variants
Breguet 521.01
Prototype, powered by three Gnome-Rhône 14Kdrs 14-cylinder two-row radial engines
Breguet 521 Bizerte
Long-range flying boat, powered by three Gnome-Rhône 14Kirs 14-cylinder two-row radial engines or three Gnome-Rhône 14N radial engines.
Breguet 522
Re-engined version of Breguet 521. Three  Hispano-Suiza 14AA radial engines. One built.
Breguet 530 Saigon
Civil version of the Breguet 521. Three Hispano-Suiza 12Ybr liquid-cooled inlines. Two built.

Operators

Aviation Navale
Air France operated the two Br.530s from 1935

Luftwaffe

Specifications (Br.521)

See also
Latécoère 611
Potez-CAMS 141

References

Bibliography

External links

 

 0521
1930s French military reconnaissance aircraft
Flying boats
Trimotors
Biplanes
Aircraft first flown in 1933